The 13th Academy Awards were held on February 27, 1941, to honor films released in 1940. This was the first year that sealed envelopes were used to keep the names of the winners secret. The accounting firm of Price Waterhouse was hired to count the ballots, after voting results in 1939 were leaked by the Los Angeles Times.

Best Original Screenplay was introduced at this ceremony, alongside Best Screenplay, which would eventually become Best Adapted Screenplay, and Best Original Story.

Independent producer David O. Selznick, who had produced the previous year's Best Picture winner Gone with the Wind (1939), produced the film with the most nominations again this year, Rebecca (11), and campaigned heavily for its win. The film won Best Picture, making Selznick the first to produce two consecutive winners; its only other win was for Best Cinematography (Black and White), marking the last time to date a film would win Best Picture but not win for either directing, acting, or writing.

The film's distributor, United Artists, was the last of the original film studios (Metro-Goldwyn-Mayer, Columbia, 20th Century-Fox, Warner Bros., RKO Radio, Universal, and Paramount) to win Best Picture. Rebecca was the first American film directed by Alfred Hitchcock, and the only one of his films to win Best Picture. Hitchcock had two films nominated for Best Picture, the other being Foreign Correspondent, and two other directors also had two films in the running: Sam Wood (Our Town and Kitty Foyle) and John Ford (The Long Voyage Home and The Grapes of Wrath, which won Best Director).

Pinocchio was the first animated feature film to win competitive Oscars, for Best Original Score and Best Original Song, starting a long tradition of animated films winning in these categories. The Thief of Bagdad received the most Oscars of the evening (3), the first time a film not nominated for Best Picture won the most awards. This and Pinocchio were the first films not nominated for Best Picture to receive multiple awards in Oscar history.

Winners and nominees 

Nominees were announced on February 10, 1941. Winners are listed first and highlighted in boldface.

Academy Honorary Awards 

 Bob Hope "in recognition of his unselfish services to the Motion Picture Industry".
 Colonel Nathan Levinson "for his outstanding service to the industry and the Army during the past nine years, which has made possible the present efficient mobilization of the motion picture industry facilities for the production of Army Training Films".

1941 Oscar firsts 

For the first time, names of all winners remained secret until the moment they received their awards.

Franklin D. Roosevelt gave a six-minute direct radio address to the attendees from the White House. It is the first time an American president participated in the event.

Multiple nominations and awards 

The following 32 film received multiple nominations:
 11 nominations: Rebecca
 7 nominations: The Grapes of Wrath and The Letter
 6 nominations: Foreign Correspondent, The Long Voyage Home, Our Town, and The Philadelphia Story
 5 nominations: The Great Dictator, Kitty Foyle, and North West Mounted Police
 4 nominations: Arise, My Love; The Sea Hawk; Spring Parade; and The Thief of Bagdad
 3 nominations: All This, and Heaven Too; Down Argentine Way; My Favorite Wife; Strike Up the Band; and The Westerner
 2 nominations: Abe Lincoln in Illinois, Arizona, Bitter Sweet, The Blue Bird, Boom Town, The Boys from Syracuse, Dark Command, Hit Parade of 1941, The Howards of Virginia, One Million B.C., Pinocchio, Second Chorus, and Waterloo Bridge

The following five films received multiple awards:
 3 wins: The Thief of Bagdad
 2 wins: The Grapes of Wrath, The Philadelphia Story, Pinocchio and Rebecca

See also
1940 in film

References

Academy Awards ceremonies
1940 film awards
1941 in Los Angeles
1941 in American cinema
February 1941 events